Miracle Strip Amusement Park was a theme park located in Panama City Beach, Florida, which operated from 1963 to 2004. The highlight of the park was The Starliner Roller Coaster, an "out-and-back" wooden coaster designed by John Allen upon the park's initial conception. A few other rides lay near the Starliner and a small arcade center and food stands rounded out the fledgling park.

As the strip grew in popularity and Panama City Beach became more of a tourist location, the park grew as well. More and more rides were added throughout the late 1960s until the 1980s, and the park grew up around the Starliner, which was by far the main draw for the park's entire run. As the city became more of a spring break hotspot, the popularity of the family friendly Miracle Strip Park decreased, though it remained a draw for families up to the 2000s.

Opening 
In 1963, the Starliner was the first roller-coaster built in Florida. Roller-coasters in general were on the decline after World War II and many doubted the Starliner's success. To start up the attraction, a group of Panama City Beach men (Harry Edwards, Alf Coleman, Bill Parker, Dawn Bennet and Julian Bennet.), spearheaded by James I. Lark Sr., created a partnership. The group took money they had pooled together at the end of 1962 and the building of the Starliner began in early 1963. Dawn and Julian Bennet originally owned the land the coaster was built on. Because of their attribute, start-up cost was cut down tremendously.

The park opened on Memorial Day weekend of 1963 to immediate popularity. The park grew as time progressed. In the mid-1960s, Ed Nielson of Birmingham, who owned and operated a municipal park (Fair Park), left Birmingham to join the up-and-coming amusement park. Nielson owned the original arcade machines (a mix of old and new hardware) but as part of his involvement leased them out to the park. Not only did the park rent from Nielson, who owned the arcade games and a few rides, but the park also rented rides from traveling carnivals at this time. Eventually the company paid off debts and the park began to grow. Some of the stockholders were bought out, and eventually the park gained the arcade games, rides, and food service. The partnership was eventually dissolved, and became owned by one family only, the Larks, who later expanded the amusement park by creating Shipwreck Island Waterpark directly across the street.

Rides 
The park featured several typical rides that were enhanced by placing them within domed structures and adding lighting effects, temperature changes, smoke effects and music. These included the Abomnible [sic] Snowman, Dante's Inferno and The Dungeon. There were also standard rides, such as bumper cars, a log flume, a scenic car driving attraction called Route 63, a train, a Vonroll type 101 skyride, a Wave Swinger, loop-o-plane and the stand-outs; the Starliner Roller Coaster and O2 Tower. The park was also dotted with multiple kiddie rides. Another ride, a bobsled ride called Bayern Kurve, was like the Musik Express, but each car carried two passengers, one sitting in front of the other one.

Starliner post closure

November 10, 2006 (Cypress Gardens)
Kent Buescher, president of Adventure Parks Group LLC, announced he's reaching into the past to help boost attendance at Cypress Gardens Adventure Park. Buescher said he plans to add Starliner, which was Florida's first roller coaster and was originally built in 1963 for the Miracle Strip Amusement Park in Panama City Beach. It will be the sixth roller coaster to the park. "We could not think of a more fitting place to salvage a major coaster than to bring it to Cypress Gardens and reintroduce it to a whole new generation," Buescher said.

It will be rebuilt at the park and brought up to safety standards, he said. Buescher estimated the total cost at $5 million.

The ride operated at Cypress Gardens for two years, and the ride closed with the park's theme park attractions in November 2008. It was the oldest roller coaster in Florida at the time. When the Starliner closed at Cypress Gardens, Space Mountain became the oldest operating roller coaster in Florida.[1]

Other attractions 
Miracle Strip boasted several other attractions, including an arcade center with various games, both electronic and more standard carnival fare, like ring toss and water-pistol games for prizes. There were multiple food and drink stands throughout the park as well and smaller versions of some of the bigger rides for children. Bumper cars, a large carousel and smaller Ferris wheel rides were also available. There was also a stage area where live shows were often scheduled near the bumper cars.

Some attractions also came and went. A spinning ride called The Spider once stood near the Dungeon and followed its spider motif, but it was later replaced by a kiddie parachute ride. There was also at one point a walk-through haunted house called "Old House", but it was demolished and replaced by the Blue Thunder in 1999. Vincent E. Valentine II designed this attraction in 1967. After "Old House" dismantled, the flashing skeletal ghost mannequin was taken to the Rootin' Tootin' Shootin' gallery, where he would have a precise shot from a rifle and mechanically rise from a grave with a weak mid-1990s "Don't Do Drugs" message strapped to his bones. It is now outside Lake Winnepesaukah in Chattanooga, Tennessee. With not enough interest in this shooting gallery at Lake Winnie, it was dismantled and stored away in a shelter at the parks maintenance shop. An almost exact replica of "Old House" is the "Mysterious Mansion" in Gatlinburg, Tennessee. Another creation of Valentine, it contains many similar features like secret passages, dropping balconies, and also a flashing skeleton similar to the one at "Old House." The "Mysterious Mansion" was built in 1980 and is still in operation despite being threatened by the wildfire that came so close to destroying downtown Gatlinburg in November, 2016. Several of the kiddie rides from Miracle Strip are here, the bees, a children's ride, and several of the rides that were under the metal building in Panama City Beach are now at Lake Winnie.

There was another ride called "Bayern Kurve" located originally where the Wave Swinger sat, then in the late 1970s, it was moved next to the train depot. During the mid to late 1970s, a steel Galaxi coaster named the "Crazy Mouse" stood right next to the "Old House".

Demise 
In 2004, it was announced that the 2004 season would be Miracle Strip's last. The owner sold the land for use in the development of condos (which were slated to be called "Miracle Condominiums"). He cited a general lack of interest in the preceding years from tourists, loss of money and increased expenses in keeping the rides running. The final season ended on September 5, 2004. Many rides were sold or simply disappeared, but others remained, slowly decaying. The log flume was taken apart and moved to Wild Adventures Park in Valdosta, Georgia. It was slated to open as the Shaka Zulu Water Ride in late 2006, but never opened to the visitors.

The Carousel was moved to Pier Park in April 2009, and appropriately named "The Miracle Strip Carousel". Its location was in the short-lived built Miracle Strip Amusement Park located beside Pier Park.

The powered tracked Sports Cars were moved to Lake Compounce in Bristol, Connecticut and reopened in 2007 as Zoomer's Gas-N-Go.

According to the cover story in the September 7, 2009 edition of the Panama City News Herald, the remains of The Miracle Strip Amusement park would be either removed from the site to be sold, or demolished. This was scheduled to start on Thursday, September 10.

By 2010, the few remaining standing structures at the park had been demolished. The only remains of the park are sidewalks, concrete barriers, foundations and the main thoroughfare, which is overgrown with weeds.

References

 Jump up ^ Space Mountain (Magic Kingdom)
 Jump up ^ http://www.wjhg.com/home/headlines/79183657.html
http://wdtn.com/2016/12/09/quick-thinking-saves-gatlinburgs-mysterious-mansion-attraction-from-wildfire/

Defunct amusement parks in Florida
1963 establishments in Florida
2004 disestablishments in Florida
Amusement parks opened in 1963
Amusement parks closed in 2004
Modern ruins